"Too Many Nights" is a song by American record producer Metro Boomin and American rapper Future featuring American rapper Don Toliver, from Metro's second studio album Heroes & Villains (2022). It was produced by Metro Boomin and Honorable C.N.O.T.E., with co-production from Allen Ritter.

Critical reception
The song was met with generally positive reviews from music critics. Robin Murray of Clash wrote, "Indeed, Don provides one of the early highlights, with his epic verse on Future team-up 'Too Many Nights'." Peter A. Berry of Complex described the song "piles elastic Don Toliver melodies for a track that feels a little like an acid trip—the opiate effect of sounds that become their own experiences." Brady Brickner-Wood of Pitchfork wrote, "Few artists melodically thrive over a Metro beat like Don Toliver, who delivers two of the album's more magnetic vocal performances on 'Too Many Nights' and 'Around Me.'"

Charts

Certifications

References

2022 songs
Metro Boomin songs
Future (rapper) songs
Don Toliver songs
Songs written by Metro Boomin
Songs written by Future (rapper)
Songs written by Don Toliver
Songs written by Allen Ritter
Song recordings produced by Metro Boomin
Song recordings produced by Allen Ritter